Asim Šehić (born 16 June 1981) is a Bosnian-Herzegovinian retired footballer, last playing in Saudi Arabia for Al-Faisaly.

International career
He made his senior debut for Bosnia and Herzegovina in an August 2004 friendly match against France, coming on as a second half substitute for Sergej Barbarez. It remained his sole international appearance.

References

External links

1981 births
Living people
People from Kalesija
Association football forwards
Croatian footballers
Croatia youth international footballers
Bosnia and Herzegovina footballers
Bosnia and Herzegovina international footballers
NK Istra players
NK Olimpija Ljubljana (1945–2005) players
NK Ljubljana players
NK Istra 1961 players
Neuchâtel Xamax FCS players
NK Slaven Belupo players
Al-Faisaly FC players
First Football League (Croatia) players
Croatian Football League players
Swiss Super League players
Swiss Challenge League players
Saudi Professional League players
Bosnia and Herzegovina expatriate footballers
Expatriate footballers in Slovenia
Bosnia and Herzegovina expatriate sportspeople in Slovenia
Expatriate footballers in Switzerland
Bosnia and Herzegovina expatriate sportspeople in Switzerland
Expatriate footballers in Saudi Arabia
Bosnia and Herzegovina expatriate sportspeople in Saudi Arabia